Qezel Arkh-e Olya (also Romanized as Qezel Ārkh-e ‘Olyā; also known as Qezel Ārkh) is a village in Chaybasar-e Shomali Rural District, Bazargan District, Maku County, West Azerbaijan Province, Iran. At the 2006 census, its population was 43, in 8 families.

References 

Populated places in Maku County